The Renault Sport Series (formerly known as World Series by Renault) is a motor racing series. The series latterly consisted of the Eurocup Formula Renault 2.0, and used to contain the Renault Sport Trophy and the Formula Renault 3.5 Series. The F4 Eurocup 1.6 was made part of the World Series in 2010, but was then folded for 2011. The flagship for the Renault Sport Series from its beginning to 2015 was the Formula Renault 3.5 Series (often referred to as simply World Series by Renault or simply WSR). It became the Formula V8 3.5 in 2016, when Renault Sport retired its backing. In 2020 Eurocup Formula Renault 2.0 folded into the Formula Regional European Championship.

History
Renault started the Formula Renault V6 Eurocup in 2003, as a support series in Eurosport's Super Racing Weekends (ETCC and FIA GT Championship). The series ran with Tatuus chassis and a Nissan 3.5 L V6 engine.

In 2005, Renault left the Super Racing Weekend and started the World Series by Renault and the Formula Renault 3.5 Series, merging both the World Series by Nissan (whose engine contract had finished) and Renault V6 Eurocup. The Dallara chassis was retained, while the Renault V6 was improved to 425 PS. Formula Renault 2.0 Eurocup and the Eurocup Mégane Trophy also joined the series in 2005 to support the main FR3.5 series.

At the end of July 2015, Renault Sport announced it would be withdrawing its backing to the Formula Renault 3.5 from 2016 onwards, handing the control of the series to co-organiser RPM. However, Renault Sport also said it would continue the Renault Sport Series with the Renault Sport Trophy and the Formula Renault 2.0 Eurocup.

Champions

Current series

Eurocup Formula Renault 2.0

Former series

Formula Renault 3.5 Series

Eurocup Mégane Trophy

F4 Eurocup 1.6

Eurocup Clio

Renault Sport Trophy

Notes

References

External links

 World Series by Renault (new website)
 Renault Sport Series

 
Recurring sporting events established in 2005